The 2006 Atlantic hurricane season was a cycle of the annual tropical cyclone season in the Atlantic Ocean in the Northern Hemisphere. The season officially began on June 1, 2006, and ended on November 30, 2006. These dates, adopted by convention, historically describe the period in each year when most subtropical or tropical cyclogenesis occurs in the Atlantic Ocean. The first storm to form in 2006 was Tropical Storm Alberto on June 10; the last, Hurricane Isaac, dissipated on October 2.

The season saw near average activity in terms of the overall number of cyclones. There were ten named storms in the Atlantic basin in 2006, of which five became hurricanes with two intensifying further into major hurricanes. It was the first season since the 2001 season in which no hurricanes made landfall in the United States, and the first since the 1994 season that no tropical cyclones formed during October; activity was slowed by a rapidly forming El Niño event in 2006, the presence of the Saharan Air Layer over the tropical Atlantic, and the steady presence of a robust secondary high-pressure area to the Azores High centered on Bermuda.

This timeline documents tropical cyclone formations, strengthening, weakening, landfalls, extratropical transitions, and dissipations during the season. It includes information that was not released throughout the season, meaning that data from post-storm reviews by the National Hurricane Center, such as a storm that was not initially warned upon, has been included.

By convention, meteorologists use one time zone when issuing forecasts and making observations: Coordinated Universal Time (UTC), and also use the 24-hour clock (where 00:00 = midnight UTC). The National Hurricane Center uses both UTC and the time zone where the center of the tropical cyclone is currently located. The time zones utilized (east to west) are: Greenwich, Cape Verde, Atlantic, Eastern, and Central. In this timeline, all information is listed by UTC first, with the respective regional time zone included in parentheses. Additionally, figures for maximum sustained winds and position estimates are rounded to the nearest 5 units (knots, miles, or kilometers), following National Hurricane Center practice. Direct wind observations are rounded to the nearest whole number. Atmospheric pressures are listed to the nearest millibar and nearest hundredth of an inch of mercury.

Timeline of storms

June

June 1 	
The 2006 Atlantic hurricane season officially begins.

June 10
1 a.m.
7 p.m. CDT (0000 UTC June 11) – Tropical Depression One strengthens into Tropical Storm Alberto.

June 13
12:30 p.m. EDT (1630 UTC) – Tropical Storm Alberto makes landfall near Adams Beach, Florida, with  winds.

June 14
2 a.m. EDT (0600 UTC) – Tropical Storm Alberto weakens into a tropical depression.
8 a.m. EDT (1200 UTC) – The remnants of Alberto become extratropical.

July
July 17
However, this depression is not assigned a number operationally, or warned on, by the National Hurricane Center.
1200 UTC – The tropical depression near Nantucket strengthens into a tropical storm, but is not operationally named.

July 18
8 a.m.
1200 UTC – The unnamed tropical storm degenerates into a remnant low.
2 p.m. EDT (1800 UTC) – Tropical Depression Two strengthens into Tropical Storm Beryl.

July 21
2:45 a.m. EDT (0645 UTC) – Tropical Storm Beryl makes landfall on the island of Nantucket, Massachusetts, with  winds.
2 p.m. EDT (1800 UTC) – Tropical Storm Beryl becomes extratropical.

July 31
8 p.m.

August

August 1
2 a.m. AST (0600 UTC) – Tropical Depression Three strengthens into Tropical Storm Chris.

August 3
2 p.m. AST (1800 UTC) – Tropical Storm Chris weakens to a tropical depression.

August 4
2 a.m. AST (0600 UTC) – Tropical Depression Chris weakens into a remnant low.

August 21
2 p.m.

August 22
8 p.m. AST (0000 UTC August 23) – Tropical Depression Four strengthens into Tropical Storm Debby.

August 24
2 p.m.

August 25
8 a.m. AST (1200 UTC) – Tropical Depression Five strengthens into Tropical Storm Ernesto.

August 26
2 a.m. AST (0600 UTC) – Tropical Storm Debby weakens to a tropical depression.
8 a.m. AST (1200 UTC) – Tropical Depression Debby weakens into a low.

August 27
2 a.m EDT (0600 UTC) – Tropical Storm Ernesto strengthens into Hurricane Ernesto.
8 a.m. EDT (1200 UTC) – Hurricane Ernesto weakens to a tropical storm.

August 28
7:15 a.m. EDT (1115 UTC) – Tropical Storm Ernesto makes a first landfall in Cuba at Playa Cazonal with  winds.

August 29
11 p.m. EDT (0300 UTC) – Tropical Storm Ernesto makes a second landfall at Plantation Key, Florida, with  winds.

August 30
1 a.m.

August 31
11:40 p.m.

September
September 1
8 a.m. EDT (1200 UTC) – Tropical Storm Ernesto weakens to a tropical depression.
2 p.m. EDT (1800 UTC) – Tropical Depression Ernesto becomes extratropical.

September 3
2 p.m.

September 5
2 a.m. AST (0600 UTC) – Tropical Depression Six strengthens into Tropical Storm Florence.

September 10
2 a.m. AST (0600 UTC) – Tropical Storm Florence strengthens into Hurricane Florence.
2 p.m.

September 11
8 a.m. EDT (1200 UTC) – Tropical Depression Seven strengthens into Tropical Storm Gordon.

September 12
8 a.m.
8 p.m. AST (0000 UTC September 13) – Hurricane Florence becomes extratropical.
8 p.m. EDT (0000 UTC September 13) – Tropical Storm Gordon strengthens into Hurricane Gordon.

September 13
2 p.m. EDT (1800 UTC) – Hurricane Gordon reaches Category 2 intensity.
8 p.m. AST (0000 UTC September 14) – Hurricane Gordon reaches Category 3 intensity, becoming the first major hurricane of the season.
8 p.m. AST (0000 UTC September 14) – Tropical Depression Eight strengthens into Tropical Storm Helene.

September 16
8 a.m. AST (1200 UTC) – Tropical Storm Helene strengthens into Hurricane Helene.

September 17
2 p.m. AST (1800 UTC) – Hurricane Helene reaches Category 2 intensity.
8 p.m. AST (0000 UTC September 18) – Hurricane Helene reaches to Category 3 intensity, becoming the second major hurricane of the season.

September 20
8 p.m. AST (0000 UTC September 21) – Hurricane Gordon becomes extratropical.

September 24
2 p.m. AST (1800 UTC) – Hurricane Helene becomes extratropical.

September 27
2 p.m.

September 28
2 a.m. EDT (0600 UTC) – Tropical Depression Nine strengthens into Tropical Storm Isaac.

September 30
8 a.m. AST (1200 UTC) – Tropical Storm Isaac strengthens into Hurricane Isaac.

October
October 2
8 a.m. AST (1200 UTC) – Hurricane Isaac weakens to a tropical storm.
8 p.m. AST (0000 UTC October 3) – Tropical Storm Isaac becomes extratropical.

November
November 30
The 2006 Atlantic hurricane season officially ends.

See also

Timeline of the 2006 Pacific hurricane season
2006 Pacific typhoon season

Notes

References

External links
 2006 Tropical Cyclone Advisory Archive, National Hurricane Center and Central Pacific Hurricane Center
 Hurricanes and Tropical Storms – Annual 2006, National Centers for Environmental Information

 Timeline

2006 Atlantic hurricane season
Articles which contain graphical timelines
2006 Atl T